The 2001–02 season was the 96th season in the history of AJ Auxerre and the club's third consecutive season in the top flight of French football. They participated in the Ligue 1, the Coupe de France and the Coupe de la Ligue.

Players

First-team squad

Transfers

In

Out

Competitions

Overall record

Division 1

League table

Results summary

Results by round

Matches

Coupe de France

Coupe de la Ligue

References 

AJ Auxerre seasons
Auxerre